Duras (ruled c.69–87), also known as Duras-Diurpaneus, was king of the Dacians between the years AD 69 and 87, during the time that Domitian ruled the Roman Empire. He was one of a series of rulers following the  Great King Burebista. Duras' immediate successor was Decebalus.

Duras and Diurpaneus
In Jordanes' king-list Duras succeeds "Coryllus", a name widely believed to be a corruption of Scorilo. Duras appears to have been ruler of Dacia from around 69. Dacian power was expanding in this period, spreading to Slovakia, Moldavia, and Wallachia. A Dacian raid into the Roman province of Moesia in 69 was pushed back by Licinius Mucianus. This may be when Scorilo died, and Duras took over as king.

Duras may be identical to the "Diurpaneus" (or "Dorpaneus") identified in Roman sources as the Dacian leader who, in the winter of 85, ravaged the southern banks of the Danube, which the Romans defended for many years. Many authors refer to him as "Duras-Diurpaneus". Other scholars argue that Duras and Diurpaneus are different individuals, or that Diurpaneus is identical to Decebalus.

War with Rome
The Roman governor of Moesia, Oppius Sabinus, raised an army and went to war with the Dacians following the Dacian (Getae) raids into Roman territory. Diurpaneus and his people defeated and decapitated Oppius Sabinus. When news of the defeat reached Rome, the citizens became fearful that the conquering enemy would invade and spread destruction further into the Empire. Because of this fear, Domitian was obliged to move with his entire army into Illyria and Moesia, the latter of which was now split into Upper and Lower regions. He ordered his commander Cornelius Fuscus to cross the Danube.

The Dacians were pushed back across the Danube, but Fuscus suffered a crushing defeat when ambushed by "Diurpaneus". At this point, the probably elderly Duras seems to have ceded power to Decebalus. Duras' concession of leadership was made peacefully. He continued to live in one of the palaces in Sarmizegetusa while serving as an advisor to Decebalus.

See also 
 Domitian's Dacian War

References

Dacian kings
1st-century monarchs in Europe